The Permanent Representative of Croatia to the United Nations is Croatia's foremost diplomatic representative to the United Nations. The position of permanent representative holds the equivalent rank to that of an ambassador and is appointed by the President of Croatia.

List of Permanent Representatives of Croatia to the United Nations

See also
Foreign relations of Croatia

External links
 

United Nations

Croatia
Lists of Croatian people